Douglas Gardner may refer to:

Douglas Gardner (actor) in Our Town (1940 film)
Douglas Gardner (figure skater), see 2000 Canadian Figure Skating Championships

See also
Sir Douglas Bruce-Gardner, 2nd Baronet (1917–1997) of the Bruce-Gardner baronets
Gardner (surname)